William, Bill, or Billy Matthews may refer to:

Politics
William Matthews (politician) (1755–1808), American politician in Maryland
Donald Ray Matthews (1907–1997), known as Billy, American congressman
Bill Matthews (born 1947), Canadian politician

Sports
Bill Matthews (footballer) (1876–1923), Australian footballer for St Kilda
William Clarence Matthews (1877–1928), American baseball infielder and lawyer
William Matthews (baseball) (1878–1946), American baseball pitcher
Billy Matthews (footballer, born 1882) (1882–1916), English footballer
Billy Matthews (footballer, born 1883) (1883–1921), Welsh footballer
William Howard Matthews (1885–1963), English footballer
Billy Matthews (footballer, born 1897) (1897–1987), Welsh footballer

Other people
William Matthews (priest) (1770–1854), American Catholic priest and President of Georgetown College
William D. Matthews (1827–1906), African American abolitionist, Civil War Union officer and Freemason
William Matthews (engineer) (1844–1922), British civil engineer
William E. Matthews (1845–1894), lawyer, financier, and civil rights activist
William Matthews (poet) (1942–1997), American poet and essayist
William Matthews (fl. 1970–1983), co-editor of the diary of Samuel Pepys
William Matthews (musician) (born 1983), American musician
William Matthews (bookbinder) (1822–1896), American bookbinder

See also
 Matthews (surname)
 Will Matthews (disambiguation)
 William Mathews (disambiguation)